Batterfish is a fish and chip shop in Portland, Oregon. Previously, the business operated in Encino, Los Angeles, as a food truck in Santa Monica, California, and as a food cart in Happy Valley, Oregon. Batterfish specializes in fish and chips and has been featured on the Food Network's Diners, Drive-Ins and Dives.

Description 
Batterfish has been described as a fish and chip shop. The business has served catfish, cod, salmon, and tilapia, with chili, curry, garlic ginger, lemon basil, and traditional batter options. Sides have included fries, onion rings, and peas. Over time, the menu has expanded to include burgers, burritos, and sandwiches.

History 

The restaurant opened in Encino, Los Angeles, in 2014, and operated there until June 2016, when owner Jason Killalee announced plans to operate Batterfish as a food truck in Santa Monica, California, starting on July 15.  

In 2017, Batterfish was featured on the Food Network's Diners, Drive-Ins and Dives (season 27, episode 3).

In 2020, Batterfish began operating from a food cart at the Happy Valley Station pod in Happy Valley, Oregon. The business relocated and became a brick and mortar restaurant in southeast Portland's Sunnyside neighborhood in 2022, operating in a space which previously housed Char Latin Grill.

Reception 
In 2015, Lucas Peterson of Eater Los Angeles said Batterfish served the best fish and chips in Los Angeles. Guy Fieri said of the restaurant, "If you can a make a living off a fish and chips truck in a town like Los Angeles, you must be doing it right." Thrillist describes Batterfish as an "Encino wonderland" and a "British pub-inspired spot with unique fish and chip options". The site recommends the curry cod with sweet potato fries. Jamie Hale included Batterfish in The Oregonian 2021 list of "The 12 best fish and chip spots in Portland".

See also 

 List of Diners, Drive-Ins and Dives episodes
 List of fish and chip restaurants
 List of seafood restaurants

References

External links 

 

2014 establishments in California
Culture in Santa Monica, California
Encino, Los Angeles
Fish and chip restaurants
Food trucks
Restaurants established in 2014
Restaurants in Los Angeles
Restaurants in Portland, Oregon
Seafood restaurants in California
Seafood restaurants in Portland, Oregon
Sunnyside, Portland, Oregon